Aegilops columnaris (syn. Triticum columnare (Zhuk.) Morris & Sears, comb. nov.) is a species in the family Poaceae.

External links
GrainGenes Species Report: Aegilops bicornis

columnaris
Plants described in 1928